John Dolmayan (born July 15, 1973) is an American musician of Armenian descent, best known as the drummer of System of a Down. He is also the drummer for the band Indicator and former drummer for Scars on Broadway. Dolmayan ranked number 33 on Loudwires list of Top 200 Hard Rock + Metal Drummers of All Time.

Early life 
John Dolmayan was born in Beirut, Lebanon, to Armenian parents. During the Lebanese Civil War, his family moved to California.

Dolmayan first became interested in drums at the age of two. His father was a saxophone player and when his mother would take him to watch his father play, he would mimic his father's drummer. He learned to play the drums by putting on records and practicing for hours a day, and continued said practice for years. Dolmayan describes his musical style as one influenced by whatever he could get his hands on, including the jazz albums belonging to his father and the rock albums he shared with his friends.

Dolmayan is a fan of The Who and cites Who drummer Keith Moon as his biggest influence. Other drummers that he cites as major influences include Led Zeppelin's John Bonham, Stewart Copeland from The Police, and Rush's Neil Peart.

System of a Down 

Dolmayan joined System of a Down in 1997 after their original drummer, Ontronik "Andy" Khachaturian, left the band due to a hand injury.

Dolmayan recorded five albums with System of a Down: System of a Down (1998), Toxicity (2001), Steal This Album! (2002), Mezmerize (2005) and Hypnotize (2005).

Dolmayan won DRUM! Magazines 2006 Drummer of the year and was the feature story in their March edition.
The band went on hiatus in 2006, but reunited in 2010 to occasionally tour.

Scars on Broadway 

After System of a Down went on hiatus in 2006, Dolmayan teamed up with Daron Malakian (System of a Down's guitarist/vocalist) to form a new band called Scars on Broadway, which recorded their eponymous debut album in 2007 and 2008. The album was released in the summer of 2008 and Dolmayan, Malakian, guitarist Franky Perez, bassist Dominic Cifarelli, and keyboardist Danny Shamoun performed concerts and prepared to embark on a tour in support of the album before Malakian suddenly cancelled the tour in October 2008.

In August 2009, Dolmayan, Franky Perez, Danny Shamoun, and Dominic Cifarelli as Scars on Broadway traveled to Iraq for a USO tour across the U.S. army bases. Their setlist consisted of covers as well as a few Scars on Broadway songs.

Scars on Broadway reunited with Malakian on May 2, 2010, and released a new single later that year. However, the project went dormant and Dolmayan was no longer involved when Malakian reformed the group in 2018.

Other projects 

Dolmayan recorded drums for Killing Joke's 2003 self-titled album, (although the band ended up going with Dave Grohl's tracks) as well as Scum of the Earth's debut album, Blah...Blah...Blah...Love Songs for the New Millennium. He also played drums on the Axis of Justice concert tour with various artists and on the Serj Tankian solo debut, Elect the Dead.

In June 2009, Dolmayan formed a new rock band called Indicator with three friends from Southern California, members of the recently disbanded punk rock band If All Else Fails: Tom Capossela, Ryan Huber, and Ryan Murphy. The band played their first show at The Bitter End in San Diego on July 22, 2009, with Dolmayan's fellow Scars on Broadway member Franky Perez joining the band for a few songs. Their second and final show took place at a strip club in Las Vegas. The band wrote 10-12 songs from 2009 to 2010; live and acoustic demos exist of them all. The four remain in contact although it is uncertain whether the songs will ever be properly recorded.

Dolmayan performed with System of a Down bandmates Daron Malakian and bassist Shavo Odadjian and Scars on Broadway guitarist Franky Perez for Odadjian's Halloween show. Dolmayan, Malakian, and Odadjian performed together again in November 2009 during a charity show for Deftones bassist Chi Cheng.

Dolmayan has devoted much of his life to the comic book retail industry, including launching Torpedo Comics out of Nevada. Torpedo Comics has two brick and mortar stores in addition to a significant online presence.

In 2009, John auditioned for The Smashing Pumpkins, in the absence of Jimmy Chamberlin.

In 2014, Dolmayan started a Kickstarter to fund cover project, These Grey Men, releasing their first single, a cover of Radiohead's "Street Spirit (Fade Out)", in January 2020. Avenged Sevenfold singer M. Shadows contributed vocals to the track; Tom Morello contributed the guitar solo at the song's close. The second single features System of a Down bandmate Serj Tankian in a cover of David Bowie's "Starman".

Personal life 
Dolmayan is married to Diana Dolmayan, who is the sister of Tankian's wife Angela, making them brothers-in-law.

On his social media accounts, Dolmayan is very politically active like his bandmates, but unlike most members of System of a Down, particularly Tankian, Dolmayan supported Donald Trump's presidency. Tankian has stated that it is "frustrating" to be politically opposite with his bandmate and brother-in-law.

A long time comic book fan, Dolmayan owns a comic book shop, Torpedo Comics, in Las Vegas.

Discography 

System of a Down
System of a Down (1998)
Toxicity (2001)
Steal This Album! (2002)
Mezmerize (2005)
Hypnotize (2005)

Serj Tankian
Elect the Dead (2007)

Scars on Broadway
Scars on Broadway (2008)

Axis of Justice
Concert Series Volume 1 (2004)

Scum of the Earth
Blah...Blah...Blah...Love Songs for the New Millennium (Guest Drums) (2004)

These Grey Men
These Grey Men (2020)

Equipment 

John uses Tama drums and hardware, Paiste cymbals, Evans Drumheads, LP percussion and his signature Vater drumsticks.
Drums – Tama Starclassic Bubinga
10"×8" Rack Tom
12"×9" Rack Tom
13"x10" Rack Tom
16"×14" Floor Tom
18"×16" Floor Tom
22"×18" Bass Drum
14"×6" John Dolmayan Signature Snare
Cymbals – Paiste
Traditionals 22" Medium Light Swish
RUDE 14" Hi-Hat
2002 6" Bell Chime
Signature 18" Fast Crash
Signature 10" Splash
Signature 8" Splash
RUDE 14" Hi-Hat
Signature 19" Full Crash
RUDE 24" Mega Power Ride
2002 24" Big Ride
2002 19" Wild China
Sticks – Vic Firth
John Dolmayan Signature 16" length, .580" diameter

Awards 
In 2006, Dolmayan won Drum! Magazines drummer of the year award. He also won the alternative rock drummer of the year award.

References

External links 

Stereokill Interview: May 2009
John Dolmayan page at SOADFans
Torpedo Comics Website
John Dolmayan page at drummerworld.com

1972 births
21st-century American drummers
Armenian rock musicians
California Republicans
System of a Down members
American heavy metal drummers
American people of Armenian descent
Lebanese emigrants to the United States
American experimental musicians
Alternative metal musicians
Musicians from Beirut
Living people
Progressive rock drummers
Grammy Award winners
Scum of the Earth (band) members
20th-century American drummers
American male drummers
Daron Malakian and Scars on Broadway members
Nu metal drummers